is a Japanese video game composer. He joined the industry through developer StarCraft, Inc. in the early 1990s, mainly working on conversions of western video games. In the mid-1990s, he joined KID, and later 5pb. in December 2006 after KID declared bankruptcy.

Works
Anonymous;Code
Chaos;Child
Chaos;Child Love Chu Chu!!
Chaos;Head
Chaos;Head Love Chu Chu!
Close to ~Inori no Oka
Dunamis 15
Disorder 6
Famicom8BIT - momo-i
FlixMix (NEC PC-98 version)
Gokujyou Seitokai
Iris ~Irisu~
King's Bounty (NEC PC-98 & FM Towns versions)
Mabino x Style
Megadimension Neptunia VII
Memories Off
Memories Off 2nd
Omoide ni Kawaru Kimi ~Memories Off~
Memo Off Mix
Memories Off ~Sorekara~
Memories Off After Rain
Memories Off #5 Togireta Film
Memories Off 6: T-wave
Might and Magic III: Isles of Terra (unreleased StarCraft version)
Monochrome
Infinity series 
Never 7: The End of Infinity
Ever 17: The Out of Infinity
Remember 11: The Age of Infinity
12Riven: The Psi-Climinal of Integral
My Merry May
My Merry Maybe
Occultic;Nine
Phantom Breaker
Phantom Breaker: Battle Grounds
Psycho-Pass: Mandatory Happiness
Rhyme Star
Robotics;Notes
Robotics;Notes DaSH
Ryu-Koku
Separate Hearts
SINce Memories: Off the Starry Sky
Space Hulk (1993 video game) (NEC PC-98 arrangements)
StarFire
Steins;Gate
Steins;Gate 0
Steins;Gate: Linear Bounded Phenogram
Steins;Gate: Darling of Loving Vows
Subete ga F ni Naru
Tentama series
Your Memories Off ~Girl's Style~
Yume no Tsubasa

References

External links

Official SoundCloud
Second SoundCloud
Official YouTube
VGMdb page
Interview at RocketBaby

1973 births
Freelance musicians
Japanese composers
Japanese male composers
Living people
Musicians from Iwate Prefecture
Video game composers